Rodrigo Osvaldo Rivera Godoy (born December 3, 1983) is a Chilean footballer.

Career
Rivera began playing professionally in 2003 with Coquimbo Unido where he played until the end of 2006.

During the January 2007 transfer window he joined  and in January 2010 he joined Universidad de Chile. He made his international debut in 2007 and was part of the squad that won the Apertura 2009 championship.

In January 2010 he joined Huachipato on loan. But he finally signed a contract after being released by Universidad de Chile.

He was reported as missing after the Chile earthquake in 2010, but later reports in early March indicated he was unharmed

Personal life
He is son of Rolando Rivera, a historical goalkeeper of Coquimbo Unido.

Honours

Club
Universidad de Chile
Primera División de Chile (1): 2009 Apertura

External links

 BDFA profile

References

1983 births
Living people
Chilean footballers
Chile international footballers
Universidad de Chile footballers
Coquimbo Unido footballers
C.D. Huachipato footballers
Ñublense footballers
Chilean Primera División players
Association football defenders
People from Iquique